Ruth Taylor may refer to:

Ruth Taylor (poet) (1961–2006), Canadian poet, editor and college professor
Ruth Taylor (actress) (1905–1984), American film actress, starred in silent movies
Ruth Ashton Taylor (born 1921), American television journalist
 Ruth Carol Taylor (born 1931), first African-American airline stewardess in the United States